The Municipality of Jesenice is a municipality in northwest Slovenia. The seat of the municipality is the town of Jesenice.

Geography
The municipality lies in the Upper Carniola region, in the Upper Sava Valley. It is bordered by the Karawanks and Austria (Carinthia) to the north, and by Mount Mežakla to the south.

Settlements
In addition to the municipal seat of Jesenice, the municipality also includes the following settlements:

 Blejska Dobrava
 Hrušica
 Javorniški Rovt
 Kočna
 Koroška Bela
 Lipce
 Planina pod Golico
 Plavški Rovt
 Podkočna
 Potoki
 Prihodi
 Slovenski Javornik

References

External links

Municipality of Jesenice on Geopedia
Jesenice municipal website

 
Jesenice
1994 establishments in Slovenia